A Presentation Director is a person who works in the broadcast television industry. They are responsible for the playout of all television programmes, commercials and other material (known as interstitials).

History
The nature of the job has changed dramatically as technology has progressed. Until recently a presentation director worked in a single presentation suite and was responsible for the manual broadcast of a single television channel, usually using video tape and a vision mixer.

With new computer automation and the rise of multi-channel satellite tv networks, a modern presentation director oversees the transmission of dozens of channels from a single suite. Sometimes a second suite (a "break-out" suite) may be employed for live television events such as sport or news.

Broadcasting occupations